Arthur Quintal (6 May 1795 – 19 November 1873) was a Pitcairn Islander who served as the island's second magistrate, in 1840/1841. Quintal was the son of Matthew Quintal, the bounty mutineer, and his wife Tevarua. The elder Quintal was killed with a hatchet in 1799. Arthur appears to have inherited some of his father's bad temper; he allegedly treated his sister Jane 'so harshly' she left the island and never returned. Quintal also allegedly made a pact with his best friend Daniel McCoy, to take each other's sister as a wife. Quintal married Catherine McCoy, and they had 9 children, including Arthur Quintal II, who also became magistrate. After Catherine's death in 1831, Arthur married Mary Christian and had a further 5 children. He succeeded his half brother as magistrate, and was succeeded by his brother-in-law. Quintal died on Norfolk Island in 1873.

References

Pitcairn Islands people of Cornish descent
Pitcairn Islands politicians
1795 births
1873 deaths
Pitcairn Islands people of Polynesian descent